The untitled demo by the American black metal band Deafheaven was self-released by the band on June 1, 2010. The demo would later be remastered/re-released as an EP in 2012 through Sargent House.

History 
The demo was initially only available in cassette and digital download formats and distributed to a few of the band's favorite blogs. It was written and recorded by the two founding members, George Clarke and Kerry McCoy, with John Kline performing on drums. Clarke and McCoy later recruited three new band members to tour in support of the demo.

After its release, several record labels began courting Deafheaven to give the demo a proper, wide release. Deathwish Inc., co-founded by Jacob Bannon of Converge, was one of these labels who reached out to the band. Deafheaven was interested in working with Deathwish, but wanted to release some newer material they had been working on at the time instead of their demo. As a result, Deathwish released a 7" single featuring "Libertine Dissolves" and "Daedalus" in January 2011 and a full-length album with all-new material titled Roads to Judah in April 2011.

In late 2012, Sargent House released a limited-edition, remastered vinyl edition of the demo with new artwork. This version is also available on the band's Bandcamp page.

Reception 
The metal blog MetalSucks gave the album a rating of (3.5/5) in 2010 and stated: "While Deafheaven's music shares surface characteristics with the classic black metal sound, this demo is so distanced from Mayhem and Immortal as to be another kind of music entirely. It engulfs rather than tramples, shimmers where so much black metal rattles."

Track listing 
All music written and recorded by Deafheaven.
 "Libertine Dissolves" – 5:13
 "Bedrooms" – 2:06
 "Daedalus" – 5:54
 "Exit:Denied" – 11:30

Personnel 
Album personnel adapted from remastered vinyl liner notes.
 Deafheaven – recording, production
 Jack Shirley – production, engineering, mastering
 Nick Steinhardt – logo design
 Karlynn Holland – logo design

References

External links 
 Deafheaven's demo EP at Bandcamp (streamed copy where licensed)

2010 EPs
Deafheaven albums
Sargent House albums
Demo albums